Daddy and Them is a 2001 American comedy-drama film written, directed by, and starring Billy Bob Thornton. In addition to Thornton, it stars John Prine, Laura Dern, Andy Griffith, Ben Affleck, Kelly Preston, Diane Ladd, Brenda Blethyn, Tuesday Knight, Jamie Lee Curtis, and Jim Varney in his final film appearance before his death in February 2000.

Daddy and Them was filmed in 1998 in the wake of Thornton’s success with Sling Blade and was originally planned as a theatrical release. The release was ultimately delayed by Miramax, who found the film not "commercial" enough. The film debuted at the Newport International Film Festival on June 6, 2001. Miramax eventually aired the film on Showtime in January 2003 and released it on DVD on January 13, 2004.

Plot synopsis
Ruby and Claude Montgomery are a very insecure and jealous couple who must reunite with extended family in Arkansas when Claude's Uncle Hazel is jailed for attempted murder. The couple travels with Ruby's older sister Rose, with whom Claude had a previous relationship, and Ruby and Rose's mother Jewel, who continuously talks about Rose and Claude's past relationship, which irritates Ruby.

Cast

Production 
The film was shot in Arkansas from August to October 1998. Filming locations included various sites around Little Rock, including Pinnacle Mountain State Park and the interior of the Arkansas State Capitol. 

The song from the same-titled album "In Spite of Ourselves" used during the closing credits was performed by John Prine and Iris DeMent.

Release 
Daddy and Them initially had a theatrical release date planned for sometime in late 1999 or early 2000. The release date was pushed back as Miramax wanted All the Pretty Horses, a studio film Thornton was directing at the time, to debut first. It continued to sit on the shelf long after Horses premiered in late 2000. Thornton has commented that friction with Miramax during the production of Horses played a role in the shelving of Daddy and Them. 

The film had its world premiere at the Newport International Film Festival on June 6, 2001.

Reception 
Daddy and Them holds an 86% rating based on 7 reviews on the review aggregate site Rotten Tomatoes. 

Eddie Cockrell of Variety wrote, "Beneath its deadpan and often absurdist exterior, Daddy and Them feels like a very personal piece of work about how family really does come first, warts and all." Brad Slager of Film Threat was more critical, writing, ”Plotless and pedantic, Daddy and Them is supposed to be a lighthearted look at family dysfunction in the Deep South, but the characters are not enjoyable enough to care about."

References

External links 
 Official site
 
 
 Daddy and Them at Box Office Mojo

2001 films
Films directed by Billy Bob Thornton
Films about dysfunctional families
2001 independent films
Films shot in Arkansas
Films set in Arkansas
2001 comedy-drama films
American comedy-drama films
Miramax films
2000s English-language films
2000s American films